New York City was an American R&B vocal group. They formed in 1972 under the name "Tri-Boro Exchange", and all of the group's members had had significant experience singing in other vocal and doo-wop ensembles. They are also from New York City.

Career
Under the direction of record producers Wes Farrell and Thom Bell, New York City released two albums and several hit singles, the biggest being 1973's "I'm Doin' Fine Now", which reached U.S. number 17. They toured in 1973 with the Big Apple Band (two of whose members would later become part of Chic) as their backing band, but after two albums, the group parted ways.

Members
Tim McQueen (lead singer)
John Brown (ex The Five Satins, The Cadillacs, The Moonglows)
Claude Johnson (ex The Genies, Don & Juan)
Eddie Schell - from Savannah, Georgia
Nile Rodgers - (Chic)
Bernard Edwards - (Chic)

Discography

Studio albums

Compilation albums
The Best of New York City (1976, Chelsea)

Singles

See also
One-hit wonders in the UK
List of 1970s one-hit wonders in the United States

References

External links

African-American musical groups
American soul musical groups
Musical quartets
American rhythm and blues musical groups
Musical groups established in 1972
Musical groups disestablished in 1975
Musical groups from New York City